Lindholmiola regisborisi is a species of air-breathing land snail, a terrestrial pulmonate gastropod mollusc in the family Helicodontidae.

Geographic distribution 
The native distribution of L. regisborisi is a small area around the river Nestos and the island of Thasos in north-eastern Greece. An isolated record from Marmara Adası, the first of this species for Turkey, is probably the result of an introduction due to anthropogenic activities.

See also
List of non-marine molluscs of Greece

References

Further reading

Lindholmiola
Molluscs of Europe
Fauna of Turkey
Gastropods described in 1928